Michael Anthony Lang (born  Michael Herbert Lang; December 10, 1941 – August 5, 2022) was an American pianist and composer, who was recognized for his highly prolific career as a pianist on more than 2500 film scores.

Early life and career
Lang was one of two sons born to publicists Jennings Lang and Flora Pam Friedheim. He was also raised in part by his stepmother, singer Monica Lewis, beginning in 1956, four years after the premature death of his birth mother. Lang obtained a bachelor of music at the University of Michigan in 1963, and studied under Leonard Stein, George Tremblay, Pearl Kaufman, and Lalo Schifrin. 

Lang spent several decades as one of the premier musical talents in Los Angeles. He was well versed in various music forms, including jazz, classical, pop and R&B. He was both a freelance jazz musician and sought-after studio musician, with a career spanning records, motion pictures and television. A three-time winner of the "MVP" Grammy award from NARAS and recipient of numerous Gold Records, Lang was conversant with many music idioms and forms. This versatility enabled him to build career as an accompanist for a large body of artists including Ray Charles, Natalie Cole, Ella Fitzgerald, Aretha Franklin, Marvin Gaye, Vince Gill, In Sync, Milt Jackson, Lee Konitz, Diana Krall, John Lennon, Arturo Sandoval, Barbra Streisand, Josh Groban, and Frank Zappa. He also played with some of the biggest names in jazz, such as Lee Ritenour, Oliver Nelson, Bud Shank, Don Ellis, Shelly Manne, and Stan Kenton. 
 
He recorded more than 2,500 scores, working with virtually every major film composer including John Williams, Jerry Goldsmith, James Newton Howard, Henry Mancini, John Barry, Elmer Bernstein, John Debney, Michael Kamen, Hans Zimmer, with numerous screen credits for solo appearances. He premiered jazz piano concerti written especially for him by Byron Olson and Brad Dechter as well as a piano work by Kevin Kaska written for him and the Royal Scottish National Orchestra. Lang wrote songs for jazz notables including Stan Getz, Herb Alpert, and Dave Grusin and recorded a jazz CD entitled Days of Wine and Roses: The Classic Songs of Henry Mancini.
  
Lang's motion picture credits include: Oblivion, Dreamer, As Good As It Gets, The Edge, Mr. Holland's Opus, The Mummy: Tomb of the Dragon, Memoirs Of A Geisha, A Dog Year, Seven Pounds, The Day the Earth Stood Still, High School Musical 3: Senior Year, Bedtime Stories, Public Enemies, Confessions of a Shopaholic, Hannah Montana: The Movie, A Thousand Words, The Forlorn, They Came from Upstairs, A League of Their Own, The Russia House, Arachnophobia, Twilight Zone: The Movie, Black Sunday, The Towering Inferno, The Paper Chase, The Poseidon Adventure, and Close Encounters of the Third Kind.

Lang recorded numerous albums with Barbra Streisand, Vanessa Williams, Russell Watson, and Michael Bolton. His television work includes The Simpsons, Family Guy, Privileged, American Dad, Orville, and The Secret Life of the American Teenager.

Selective discography 
With Robbie Williams
 Swings Both Ways (Island Records, 2013)

With John Lennon
 Rock 'n' Roll (John Lennon album) (Apple, 1975)

With Sarah Vaughan
 Songs of The Beatles (Atlantic Records, 1981)

With Dusty Springfield
 Cameo (ABC Records, 1973)

With Solomon Burke
 Like a Fire (Shout! Factory, 2008)

With Tom Waits
 Heartattack and Vine (Asylum Records, 1980)

With Peggy Lee
 Mirrors (A&M Records, 1975)

With José Feliciano
 José Feliciano (Motown, 1981)

With Vince Gill
 Breath of Heaven: A Christmas Collection (MCA Records, 1998)

With Bette Midler
 Bette Midler Sings the Peggy Lee Songbook (Columbia Records, 2005)

With Kenny Rogers
 We've Got Tonight (Liberty Records, 1983)

With Aretha Franklin
 Aretha (Arista Records, 1980)

With Willie Nelson
 Healing Hands of Time (Capitol Records, 1994)

With Natalie Cole
 Unforgettable... with Love (Elektra Records, 1991)
 Stardust (Elektra Records, 1996)

With Amy Grant
 A Christmas to Remember (A&M Records, 1999)

With Paul Anka
 Rock Swings (Verve, 2005)
 Songs Of December (Decca Records, 2012)

With Melissa Manchester
 If My Heart Had Wings (Atlantic Records, 1995)

With Neil Diamond
 Heartlight (Columbia Records, 1982)

With Michael Bolton
 This Is The Time: The Christmas Album (Columbia Records, 1996)

With Barry Manilow
 Manilow Sings Sinatra (Arista Records, 1998)

With Carole Bayer Sager
 Sometimes Late at Night (The Boardwalk Entertainment, 1981)

With Barbra Streisand
 Wet (Columbia Records, 1979)
 Back to Broadway (Columbia Records, 1993)
 A Love Like Ours (Columbia Records, 1999)
 Christmas Memories (Columbia Records, 2001)
 The Movie Album (Columbia Records, 2003)
 Encore: Movie Partners Sing Broadway (Columbia Records, 2016)

Notes

References

External links
 Michael Lang biography by Scott Yanow, discography and album reviews, credits & releases at AllMusic
 
 
 NAMM Oral History Interview June 19, 2012

1941 births
2022 deaths
20th-century American male musicians
20th-century American pianists
21st-century American male musicians
21st-century American pianists
American classical pianists
American jazz pianists
American male classical pianists
American male jazz pianists
Musicians from Los Angeles
University of Michigan School of Music, Theatre & Dance alumni